The 1996 Yukon general election was held on September 30, 1996 to elect the seventeen members of the 29th Yukon Legislative Assembly in Yukon Territory, Canada. The governing Yukon Party, a conservative party, was defeated by the social democratic New Democratic Party (NDP). The NDP formed a new majority government of the territory with 11 seats. Party leader Piers McDonald became Government Leader. The Yukon Party and the centrist Yukon Liberal Party each won three seats, although Liberal leader Ken Taylor failed to be elected.

Results by party

|- style="background:#ccc;"
! rowspan="2" colspan="2" style="text-align:left;"|Party
! rowspan="2" style="text-align:left;"|Party leader
!rowspan="2"|Candidates
! colspan="4" style="text-align:center;"|Seats
!colspan="3" style="text-align:center;"|Popular vote
|- style="background:#ccc;"
| style="text-align:center;"|1992
| style="text-align:center;font-size: 80%;"|Dissol.
| style="text-align:center;"|1996
| style="text-align:center;"|Change
| style="text-align:center;"|#
| style="text-align:center;"|%
| style="text-align:center;"|Change

|align=left|Piers McDonald
|align="right"|16
|align="right"|6
|align="right"|6
|align="right"|11
|align="right"|+5
|align="right"|5,760
|align="right"|39.81%
|align="right"|+4.73%

|align=left|John Ostashek
|align="right"|15
|align="right"|7
|align="right"|7
|align="right"|3
|align="right"|-4
|align="right"|4,392
|align="right"|30.36%
|align="right"|-5.52%

|align=left|Ken Taylor
|align="right"|16
|align="right"|1
|align="right"|1
|align="right"|3
|align="right"|+2
|align="right"|3,464
|align="right"|23.94%
|align="right"|+7.84%

| colspan="2" style="text-align:left;"|Independent
|align="right"|7
|align="right"|3
|align="right"|3
|align="right"|0
|align="right"|-3
|align="right"|852
|align="right"|5.89%
|align="right"|N/A
|-
| style="text-align:left;" colspan="3"|Total
| style="text-align:right;"|54
| style="text-align:right;"|17
| style="text-align:right;"|17
| style="text-align:right;"|17
| style="text-align:right;"|
| style="text-align:right;"|14,468
| style="text-align:right;"|100.00%
| style="text-align:right;"|
|}

Member Changes from Previous Election

Incumbents not Running for Reelection
The following MLAs had announced that they would not be running in the 1996 election:

Independent
Bea Firth (Riverdale South)

New Democratic Party
Danny Joe (Mayo-Tatchun)
Margaret Commodore (Whitehorse Centre)

Yukon Party
Bill Brewster (Kluane)
David Millar (Klondike)
John Devries (Watson Lake)

Riding Results
Bold indicates party leaders
† - denotes a retiring incumbent MLA

|-
|bgcolor=whitesmoke|Faro
|| 
|Trevor Harding530
|
|
|
|Ed Peake29
|
| 
|| 
|Trevor Harding
|-
|bgcolor=whitesmoke|Klondike
|
|Tim Gerberding372
|| 
|Peter Jenkins 603
|
|Glen Everitt96
|
|John Cramp21
|| 
|David Millar†
|-
|bgcolor=whitesmoke|Kluane
|| 
|Gary McRobb 377
|
|Olli Wirth144
|
|John Farynowski177
|
|Bonnie Lock66
|| 
|Bill Brewster†
|-
|bgcolor=whitesmoke|Lake Laberge
|| 
|Doug Livingston328
|
|Mickey Fisher325
|
|Linda Biensch242
|
|Mark Bain221
|| 
|Mickey Fisher
|-
|bgcolor=whitesmoke|McIntyre-Takhini
|| 
|Piers McDonald441
|
|Scott Howell251
|
|Rosemary Couch182
|
|Clinton Fraser21
|| 
|Piers McDonald
|-
|bgcolor=whitesmoke|Mayo-Tatchun
|| 
|Eric Fairclough454
|
|Michael McGinnis180
|
|
|
|
|| 
|Danny Joe†
|-
|bgcolor=whitesmoke|Mount Lorne
|| 
|Lois Moorcroft484
|
|Allan Doherty247
|
|Ken Taylor299
|
|Allen Luheck166
|| 
|Lois Moorcroft
|-
|bgcolor=whitesmoke|Porter Creek North
|
|Luigi Zanasi191
|| 
|John Ostashek403
|
|Don Roberts384
|
|
|| 
|John Ostashek
|-
|bgcolor=whitesmoke|Porter Creek South
|
|Mark Dupuis181
|
|Alan Nordling397
|| 
|Pat Duncan435
|
| 
|| 
|Alan Nordling
|-
|bgcolor=whitesmoke|Riverdale North
|
|Dave Stockdale347
|| 
|Doug Phillips450
|
|Flo Leblanc-Hutchinson146
|
| 
|| 
|Doug Phillips
|-
|bgcolor=whitesmoke|Riverdale South
|
|
|
|Barbara Toombs349
|| 
|Sue Edelman476
|
|
|| 
|Bea Firth† 
|-
|bgcolor=whitesmoke|Riverside
|
|Gary Umbrich260
|
|Ed Henderson160
|| 
|Jack Cable267
|
|
|| 
|Jack Cable
|-
|bgcolor=whitesmoke|Ross River-Southern Lakes
|| 
|Dave Keenan484
|
|
|
|Bill Munroe49
|
|Willard Phelps317
|| 
|Willard Phelps 
|-
|bgcolor=whitesmoke|Vuntut Gwitchin
|| 
|Robert Bruce69 *
|
|Esau Schafer69
|
|Shirlee Frost27
|
| 
|| 
|Esau Schafer
|-
|bgcolor=whitesmoke|Watson Lake
|| 
|Dennis Fentie442
|
|Barrie Ravenhill249
|
|Dave Kalles106
|
|Mickey Thomas40
|| 
|John Devries†
|-
|bgcolor=whitesmoke|Whitehorse Centre
|| 
|Todd Hardy328
|
|Linda Dixon216
|
|Jon Breen188
|
|
|| 
|Margaret Commodore†
|-
|bgcolor=whitesmoke|Whitehorse West
|| 
|David Sloan486
|
|Shelda Hutton323
|
|Larry Bagnell383
|
| 
|| 
|David Sloan
|}

Because of the tie vote, Robert Bruce was declared elected after his name was drawn from a hat. He was later re-elected after a 1997 by-election after irregularities led to a court order invalidating the election.

References

1996 elections in Canada
1996
Election
September 1996 events in Canada